Senza Rete was a music show created by Giorgio Calabrese and broadcast by Rai 1 (at the time  Programma Nazionale) from 1968 to 1975.

History 
The first episode was aired June 27, 1968. Initially broadcast on Thursday night, thanks to the high ratings (up to 18 million viewers) starting from the third edition it was moved to the more prestigious Saturday night slot. The show consisted on two or three popular musical guests performing live several hits of their repertoire at the Auditorium Rai in Naples.

Over the years several presenters alternated: Enrico Simonetti, Luciano Salce, Raffaele Pisu, Ric e Gian, Enrico Montesano, Paolo Villaggio, Renato Rascel, Pippo Baudo,  Aldo Giuffré, Alberto Lupo, Lino Banfi, Jenny Tamburi. Pino Calvi (1968-1973), Bruno Canfora (1974) and Tony De Vita (1975) served as conductors.

Among the guests of the show, there were Mina, Milva, Rita Pavone, Ornella Vanoni, Gianni Morandi, Bruno Lauzi, Enzo Jannacci, Antonello Venditti, Roberto Vecchioni, Le Orme, Pooh, Mia Martini, Marcella Bella, New Trolls.

References

External links 
 
 The first season on RaiPlay.

1968 Italian television series debuts
1975 Italian television series endings
Italian music television series
RAI original programming
1960s Italian television series
1970s Italian television series
Pop music television series